Coimbatore - MGR Chennai Central Intercity Express is a train that runs between Chennai, the state capital of Tamil Nadu and Coimbatore, the second largest city of the state. It replaced erstwhile Chennai Coimbatore Shatabdi Express used to run from 1995  to 2000 and present Chennai Central–Coimbatore Shatabdi Express was not existed then. It is operated by the Southern Railway zone of the Indian Railways. 12679 is departs at 14:30 from Chennai central and arrives at 22:15. in Coimbatore; 12680 departs at 6:15 from Coimbatore and arrives at 13:50 in Chennai Central. The Train was given an Upgrade to LHB Coaches from 23 December 2019.

Stops 
Stops for 12680

Stops for 12679

References

Transport in Chennai
Express trains in India
Transport in Coimbatore
Rail transport in Tamil Nadu
Railway services introduced in 1997
Intercity Express (Indian Railways) trains